The International Competition Network (ICN) is an informal, virtual network that seeks to facilitate cooperation between competition law authorities globally. It was established in 2001 after the publication of a Final Report of the International Competition Policy Advisory Committee to the US Attorney General and Assistant Attorney General for Antitrust (or the ICPAC report, for short). Competition law experts in the US recommended that increased collaboration with overseas authorities could contribute to the coordination of enforcement and sharing of information on competition policy globally. It comprised 132 member states from 120 competition jurisdiction exclusively devoted to international competition enforcement.

Leadership 
Lina Khan, the chairwoman of the U.S. Federal Trade Commission, was chosen to serve as the ICN's vice chair in December 2022.

History 

Its first annual conference was held in Naples, Italy in September 2002, with representatives from 59 countries and NGOs. The second conference was in June 2003 in Merida, Mexico. Working groups review different policy areas, such as mergers or competition advocacy. The last annual conference was hosted by Competition Commission of Singapore in April 2016. The upcoming annual conference will be hosted by Portuguese Competition Authority in May 2017. It will be hosted by Competition Commission of India in March - April 2018 at New Delhi.

References

External links
 International Competition Network

Organizations established in 2001
International law organizations
Competition law
Competition regulators